Nebria rotundicollis is a subspecies of ground beetle in the  Nebriinae subfamily that is endemic to Pakistan. Both of it subspecies, Nebria rotundicollis rotundicollis and Nebria rotundicollis tenulis are endemic to the same country.

References

rotundicollis
Beetles described in 1989
Beetles of Asia
Endemic fauna of Pakistan